Jirapart Waiprakorn (born October 20, 1996), known as Manachai, is a Muay Thai fighter and Former WMO Welterweight World Champion from Thailand. He was originally from Buriram, in the north-eastern Isaan region of Thailand, now fighting out of YOKKAOSaenchaiGym in Bangkok.

Biography

Early career 
Manachai started training and fighting at the age of 8. He won his first fight and was rewarded with 500 baht. The relatively large prize money motivated him to train in the sport full-time. He joined Kiatmoo9 Gym in Buriram, training with the camp's fighters like Singdam, Superlek and Rungnarai for many years.

During his early career he competed in the Isaan region and made his way to fighting at Lumpinee Stadium in Bangkok, during which he was ranked number one in his weight division at one point.

2016 - Present 
In April 2016, Manachai moved to the YOKKAO camp in Bangkok, training with Saenchai, Singdam and Pakorn amongst others.

In February 2017, CNN Money featured YOKKAO in a television documentary special showcasing young, successful businesses in Thailand. Manachai appeared on the program together with YOKKAO camp mates, Singdam and Saenchai.

After 2 wins at YOKKAO 17 and YOKKAO Next Generation Khorat in March and May 2016 respectively. Following this period, he had 2 unsuccessful attempts at winning the Toyota 8-man tournament, losing to Yodthuangton via decisions on both occasions. He also sustained losses at YOKKAO 21 to Australian Kurtis Staiti, as well as in Korat and Omnoi Stadium.

After a short break from training and competing, Manachai returned to the ring and went on a 9-win streak from July 2017. He kicked off the series of victories when he went up against  former 2013 Rajadamnern champion, Kiatpetch Suanaharneekmai at the YOKKAO Next Generation event in Suraburi. Manachai outscored Kiatpetch to bring home the win.

On 20 August 2017, Manachai appeared on the inaugural All-star Fight promotion alongside YOKKAO teammate, Pakorn and Muay Thai star, Buakaw. On this occasion, he defeated Iranian fighter, Vahid Shahbazi, a veteran of the ring, via decision.

A month later, Manachai made his second Hong Kong appearance with YOKKAO 26 on 11 September winning a unanimous decision over his Spanish opponent, Carlos Araya.

On 30 September, Manachai returned to All-Star Fight in Bangkok fighting against a Laotian opponent, Noukhith Latsaphao. He defeated Noukhith a minute into the third round via an elbow KO.

Manachai continued his win streak at his next 2 appearances. The first on 17 November 2017 in Surin, Manachai won the fight in round 3 via low-kick KO. On 23 December, he returned to Lumpinee Stadium, winning the fight again via low-kick KO.

On 20 January 2018, he made his Italian debut on The Night of Kick and Punch promotion facing local fighter, Nuriel Glorian Cauli. He won the fight via referee stoppage in round 1.

On 18 February 2018, Manachai fought against Lumpinee Champion Pongsiri PKSaenchaiGym at Channel 7 stadium. The fight was originally set up for the Channel 7 147lbs title that was scrapped a day before the fight. Manachai outperformed his opponent in the decisive rounds 3 and 4 to take the win over decision.

On 24 March 2018, Manachai took on Attachai Tor Morsi at Siam Boxing Stadium broadcast live on Channel 3. Manachai ended the fight in round 1 and won via low-kick KO. The victory made it a 9-win streak for Manachai.

In April 2018, Manachai was ranked the #2 Welter weight ranked on Lumpinee Stadium, and #4 Welter weight on Rajadamnern Stadium by muaythai2000.com.

On 18 April 2018, Manachai took his 10th straight win when he returned to Italy for the Parabellum promotion against Christian Zahe. He won the fight over unanimous decision after 3 rounds.

On 29 April 2018, UK fighter Mo Abdurahman concluded Manachai's winning streak at YOKKAO Next Generation Southampton with a round-3 KO via right hook.

In May 2018, Manachai was announced as a member of the All Star Fight Dream Team that features other prominent fighters such as Buakaw Banchamek, Yodsanklai Fairtex, Superbon Banchamek, Saeksan Or. Kwanmuang and Jomthong Chuwatthana.

On 21 May 2018, Manachai faced Canadian fighter, Abdou Haddad on All Star Fight 4 held in Hong Kong. He won the fight via decision after 3 rounds, which was featured on Fox Sports Asia's Facebook page.

On 29 October 2018, Manachai took on Julio Lobo from Brazil for the WBC Muay Thai World Welterweight title at YOKKAO 34. He won the fight via decision and was crowned the new WBC welterweight champion at the Kowloon Bay International Trade & Exhibition Centre.

On 17 December 2019, Manachai fought Trithep LSM99Max for the WMO world championship title at Lumpinee Stadium. He won the fight via round-4 KO to be crowned the new WMO world champion 147lbs.

Titles and accomplishments
 WBC Muaythai
 2018 WBC Muay Thai Welterweight 147lbs. World Champion 

 World Muaythai Organization
 2019 WMO World Muay Thai Organization Welterweight 147lbs World Champion

Muay Thai record

Legend:

References

1996 births
Living people
People from Buriram province
Thai male Muay Thai practitioners